William Gerald Klatt (October 16, 1947 – December 23, 2011) was an American professional ice hockey player.  He played 143 regular season games in the World Hockey Association for the Minnesota Fighting Saints between 1972 and 1974.

Klatt moved overseas to play in Austria following the 1974–75 season and also was a member of the United States national team at the 1976 Ice Hockey World Championship tournament in Katowice.

Klatt died on December 23, 2011 of leukemia aged 64.

Awards and honors

References 

The Complete Historical and Statistical Reference to the World Hockey Association by Scott Surgent, Xaler Press,

External links 

1947 births
2011 deaths
American men's ice hockey right wingers
ATSE Graz players
Deaths from cancer in Minnesota
Deaths from leukemia
Minnesota Fighting Saints players
Minnesota Golden Gophers men's ice hockey players
Oklahoma City Blazers (1965–1977) players
Omaha Knights (CHL) players
Ice hockey people from Minneapolis